The No Fixed Address Tour was the fifth headlining concert tour by Canadian rock band Nickelback, in support of their eighth studio album No Fixed Address. The tour was announced on November 5, 2014, as well as The Pretty Reckless, Pop Evil, and Lifehouse as the support act for the majority of the shows in North American while Monster Truck will be the support act in Australia and Europe (2016).

The second North American leg of the tour had to be canceled when lead vocalist Chad Kroeger required surgery for a cyst on his voice box. The entire leg of the European tour was postponed until Autumn 2016.

Set list

Some songs not performed at every show
"Million Miles an Hour"
"Something in Your Mouth"
"Photograph"
"Hero"
"What Are You Waiting For?" or "Gotta Be Somebody"
"Far Away"
"Edge of a Revolution"
"Master of Puppets"/"Walk" (Metallica, Pantera covers)
"Too Bad"
"Someday"
"Animals"
"Moby Dick" (Led Zeppelin cover, drum solo)
"She Keeps Me Up"
"Take It Easy"/"Hotel California" (Eagles covers)
"Summer of '69" (Bryan Adams cover)
"Rockstar"
"When We Stand Together"
"Figured You Out"
"How You Remind Me"
Encore
"Everlong" (Foo Fighters cover)
"Burn It to the Ground"

Songs performed in Saskatoon
"Blow at High Dough" (The Tragically Hip cover)
"Don't Stop Believin'" (Journey cover)

Tour dates

Critical reception
Adrien Begrand of PopMatters noted that this tour lacked the pyrotechnics that were used in their previous tour, the Here and Now Tour, and felt as if this tour would cater more to the mainstream country audience instead of the hard rock audience. The only production used in the show were a video screen, simple stage, restrained lighting and a set list filled with mostly ballads and covers. Begrand also felt like the covers were a cheap attempt to receive applause more than they would with their own songs. He did give praise to the performances of "Animals" and "She Keeps Me Up".

References

2015 concert tours
2016 concert tours
Nickelback concert tours